Engine is the fourteenth studio album by Japanese heavy metal band Loudness. Released in 1999, it was the third and final album to feature the lineup of guitarist Akira Takasaki, lead vocalist Masaki Yamada, bassist Naoto Shibata, and drummer Hirotsugu Homma before Takasaki reunited the original lineup in 2001.

Track listing
All music by Akira Takasaki and all lyrics by Masaki Yamada, except "Ace in the Hole" with music by Hirotsugu Homma and lyrics by Kayla Ritt.

"Soul Tone" (instrumental) - 2:43
"Bug Killer" - 5:04
"Black Biohazard" - 3:55
"Twist of Chain" - 3:40
"Bad Date (Nothing I Can Do)" - 2:58
"Apocalypse" - 4:11
"Ace in the Hole" - 4:09
"Sweet Dreams" - 4:37
"Asylum" - 6:27
"Burning Eye Balls" - 4:58
"Junk His Head" - 5:51
"2008 (Candra 月天)" (instrumental) - 2:47
"Coming Home" - 6:07

Personnel
Loudness
Masaki Yamada - vocals
Akira Takasaki - guitars, producer
Naoto Shibata - bass
Hirotsugu Homma - drums

Production
Daniel McClendon - engineer, mixing
Masayuki Aihara - engineer on track 1, mixing on tracks 1, 10, 12
Fumiko Kunou - mastering
George Azuma - supervisor
Masao Nakajima - executive producer

References

1999 albums
Loudness (band) albums